Tamika Jones (born 13 June 2003) is an Australian rugby union player. She plays for the Western Force in the Super W competition.

Biography 
Jones was named in the Australian team to play Fiji and Japan in two test matches. She played for the Australian Barbarians team against Japan who were on tour in Australia.

Jones was awarded the Rebecca Clough Medal for the women’s Super Rugby best and fairest in June 2022. She was then selected to represent the Wallaroos squad at the Pacific Four Series in New Zealand.

References 

2003 births
Living people
Australia women's international rugby union players
Australian female rugby union players